The Cab is an American rock band from Las Vegas, Nevada. Their debut album, Whisper War, was released on April 29, 2008. They have been called "The Band You Need to Know 2008" by Alternative Press magazine. They were also featured in the '100 Bands You Need to Know in 2010' by the magazine and were one of the three bands featured on the cover page, along with Never Shout Never and Hey Monday. Their second album Symphony Soldier was released on August 23, 2011, with its first single "Bad" released to iTunes July 11, 2011, and announced by the band on July 18. The Cab funded the entire album by themselves and left their Fueled by Ramen/Decaydance label, self-releasing Symphony Soldier. AbsolutePunk gave an extremely positive review with a rating of 95%, calling the album a "masterpiece". The pre-orders in the band's webstore featured eleven packages, ranging from $10 to $9,999. Symphony Soldier is digitally available on iTunes, and only available as physical CDs from the band's webstore. The band's latest work, an EP titled Lock Me Up, was released on April 29, 2014. They have not released any new material since 2014, leaving the future of the band uncertain.

History

2004–2007: Formation and early years
Band members Alexander DeLeon  and Cash Colligan first began playing music together at Liberty High School (Henderson, Nevada) and recorded demos with a friend, NSL, as a duo which they put up on their MySpace page. At this time, future guitarist Ian Crawford went to school in Auburn, WA and started out playing his guitar in talent shows and posting them on YouTube.  DeLeon asked drummer Alex Johnson, who was playing in a local hardcore band, to join The Cab. In late 2005, it became a full band with guitarist Paul Garcia, guitar/pianist Alex Marshall, and drummer Alex Johnson, playing its first show at The Alley in Las Vegas.  The band signed to local label Olympus Records in January 2006 but released no material. After giving a demo to Spencer Smith and Jon Walker of Panic! at the Disco at a Cobra Starship/Boys Like Girls/Cartel show, Smith helped them sign to Decaydance Records in May 2007. Shortly after this, the band's members graduated from high school. During this time they decided to replace Garcia with Ian Crawford, who moved from Washington to join the band.

2007–2008: Rise to fame
Blender named them No. 420 on their Top 100 Hot Report in September 2007, before they released any official material. The group has toured with Panic! at the Disco, We the Kings, Metro Station, The Higher, Cobra Starship, There For Tomorrow, Jessica Poland, Forever the Sickest Kids, Dashboard Confessional, Plain White T's, The Hush Sound, and others. In February 2008, their touring van turned over in Wisconsin, but none of the members were seriously injured, and they only missed one tour date. In March 2008, the band played SXSW.

2008: Whisper War
Their Matt Squire-produced first album, Whisper War, was released on April 29, 2008, featuring Brendon Urie of Panic! at the Disco and Patrick Stump of Fall Out Boy on "One of Those Nights," co-written by Stump and the first single from the CD. The video for "One of Those Nights" features members of both Panic! at the Disco and Pete Wentz and Patrick Stump of Fall Out Boy. By February 15, 2008, the featured song from the album, "I'll Run", received over 300,000 hits on the band's MySpace page. On October 30, their third single, "Bounce", was revealed in a new music video on the Fueled by Ramen page on YouTube. This song peaked at No. 69 on the defunct US Billboard Pop 100 chart.

On May 7, 2008, Whisper War debuted on the US Billboard 200 at No. 108, placing it at No. 1 on the Billboard Heatseekers Albums chart for new and developing artists.

The Cab began the Dance Across the Country Tour with The Hush Sound, Steel Train and The Morning Light on July 7 in Pittsburgh, Pennsylvania. Hey Monday opened for them at The Culture Room in South Florida. The "Why So Serious? Tour" began in September with support from This Providence, Hey Monday and A Rocket to the Moon. In October, they also joined Panic! at the Disco, Dashboard Confessional, and the Plain White T's on the Rock Band Live tour.

Their songs "Bounce" and "One of Those Nights" are featured as downloadable tracks in Rock Band 2, although "One of Those Nights" is an alternate version than that of the one on "Whisper War".

The Cab has appeared on Punk Goes Pop 2, covering Rihanna's "Disturbia". In February and March 2009 the band toured with We the Kings, There for Tomorrow and Versaemerge on the "Secret Valentine Tour". On May 1, 2009, the band performed an entire set dedicated to Queen.

After a short break, they toured with We the Kings, Forever the Sickest Kids, Nevershoutnever! and Mercy Mercedes on the "Bamboozle Road Show Tour". Shortly after, the band announced their first national headlining tour, called the What Happens in Vegas... tour, with the support of The Secret Handshake, A Rocket to the Moon, Eye Alaska, Anarbor, The Summer Set, and My Favorite Highway. The tour began on June 18 and ended on August 9.

2009–2012: Symphony Soldier and lineup changes
On June 1, 2009, lead singer Alexander DeLeon announced on his blog that guitarist Ian Crawford had decided to leave the band. Although DeLeon did say that Crawford had decided to leave due to creative differences, there seemed to be no animosity between him and the band. For their then-upcoming What Happens in Vegas... tour, The Cab announced that their friend Bryan Dawson would be replacing Ian Crawford, who soon became the touring guitarist of Panic! at the Disco.

On August 19, 2009, bassist Cash Colligan announced that he would also be leaving the band. The news of Colligan's split first appeared on The Cab's official MySpace blog. Colligan's departure, like Crawford's, seemed to be amicable as the band wrote, "We wish him the best and I'm sure he'll be no stranger at a Cab show or anytime we're back in town." The same day Colligan posted his own explanation for leaving the band on his official MySpace blog. He wrote, "I'm proud as a founding member of this band to say the things I've done, the people I've met and the friends I've made. After five years it's time for me to take a mental nap. Being home I can collect my thoughts and move forward." Colligan went on to say that he would be settling down in Las Vegas and that now is just not the right time for him to be touring on the road.

In a blog DeLeon posted after Cash decided to leave the band he said, "Thank you again to everyone for your unending support, you've made the tour and this summer one we'll never forget. We hope to see everybody again soon. We are happier than ever and have so many songs we are dying to show you guys! Get ready... the best is yet to come."

They announced they will be featured in the Alternative Press Tour 2010 and Warped Tour 2010. On January 16, 2010, Alex DeLeon announced via Twitter that "Bryan is going to be a father!". Bryan later confirmed, and confirmed his leave from the band, saying via his own Twitter that he "wanted to thank everyone for the support and love in this crazy time. Love you all now watch out the guys are gonna do great things, promise." A day later, Alex DeLeon announced that The Cab are looking for a new guitar player: "Anyone know any guitar players? serious submissions only. Here is your chance. We need someone who can really play. Big shoes to fill." In the Summer of 2010, the band gained new guitarist and cellist Chantry Johnson. They were recently featured on "The Real World".

The Cab was on the "Ap Tour" in March–May 2010. They played songs off Whisper War and also performed the song, "Locked Up", from their recently released album.

On March 5, DeLeon posted on his Twitter account "singing on the las vegas house of blues stage tonight. it's been too long. been craving the lights. can anyone guess with who?" Later that night he appeared on stage with former Cab bassist Cash Colligan's new band, Play for Keeps. DeLeon sang guest vocals on the Play for Keeps song "Just Like the Movies" live, where normally Travis Clark from We the Kings sings on the recording.

On June 22, 2011, The Cab announced on their website that they were departing from their label Fueled by Ramen and Decaydance Records before finally releasing their new album, Symphony Soldier. The first single from the album, "Bad", debuted on Sirius XM Radio.

Symphony Soldier was released on August 23, 2011. with its first single "Bad" released to iTunes early July and announced by the band on July 18. AbsolutePunk gave an extremely positive review, calling the album a "masterpiece". The Cab guitarist alumnus Ian Crawford played guitar for the album. It features several guest artists co-writing, including Pete Wentz, Bruno Mars and Adam Levine.

In August 2011, The Cab gained a second guitarist, Frank Sidoris, and drummer, Dave Briggs. The band toured with Simple Plan, Forever The Sickest Kids, and Marianas Trench in the fall of 2011. The band co-headlined the "Everything's Fine Symphony Soldier" tour during January and February 2012 with best friends The Summer Set, with supporting acts He Is We, Days Difference, and Paradise Fears. The band also co-headlined a tour with Parachute in the summer of 2012.

On June 20, 2012, they announced that they would be supporting Maroon 5 on the Overexposed World Tour, set to take place in September–October. They visited South Korea, Philippines, Indonesia, Malaysia, Thailand, China, Japan, Taiwan, and Australia. That same summer, Sidoris announced his intention to leave the band and join Slash's new band Slash featuring Myles Kennedy and The Conspirators.

2012–2016: Third studio album, Lock Me Up, and hiatus
After remaining independent for over a year, on August 31, 2012, The Cab announced that they had signed a record deal with Universal Republic. With the signing to the record label, in late 2012, the band stated, during an interview, that they have begun work on their new album, to be released in mid-2014. An EP, Lock Me Up, was released on April 29, 2014.

On April 25, 2014, Alex Marshall announced he had parted ways with The Cab via their official Facebook page.

On October 31, 2015, Alexander DeLeon announced that he would be releasing a new single, "Guns and Roses", as a solo artist, under the moniker Bohnes, on November 13, 2015.

In an interview with All Access, DeLeon confirmed that the band is currently taking a break as he works as a solo artist. DeLeon hinted that there could be a potential return for The Cab in the future.

2020–present: End of hiatus with new album
In January of 2020, a new song was teased on Twitter along with an announcement of a new album in the works.

Musical style 
The Cab's musical style has been described as pop rock, pop punk, alternative rock, emo pop, power pop, and pop.

The band's EP "Lock Me Up" departed from the band's previous pop-punk and alternative rock sound, in favor of pop, R&B and electropop.

Band members

Current members
 Alexander DeLeon – lead vocals (2004–present), piano (2014–present)
 Joey Thunder – bass (2009–present)
 Chantry Johnson – lead guitar, backing vocals, cello (2010–present), rhythm guitar (2014–present)
 Dave Briggs – drums, percussion (2011–present)

Former members
 Alex T. Marshall - rhythm guitar, piano, backing vocals (2005–2014)
 Alex Johnson – drums, percussion, backing vocals (2005–2011)
 Bryan Dawson – lead guitar (2009–2010)
 Cash Colligan – bass, backing vocals (2004–2009)
 Paul Garcia – lead guitar (2004–2007)
 Charles Henry – lead guitar (2010–2012)
 Ian Crawford – lead guitar, backing vocals (2007–2009)

Timeline

Discography

 Whisper War (2008)
 Symphony Soldier  (2011)

References

External links
 Official site

Rock music groups from Nevada
Musical groups established in 2004
Fueled by Ramen artists
Decaydance Records artists
Crush Management artists
Alternative rock groups from Nevada